An epilogue or epilog is a piece of writing usually used to bring closure to a work of literature or drama.

Epilogue or epilog may also refer to:

Film
 Epilogue (1950 film), or The Orplid Mystery, a 1950 West German crime film
 Epilogue (film), a 1983 Soviet drama film
Epilogue, a 2018 American experimental film from Nathaniel Dorsky's Arboretum Cycle

Television 
 "Epilogue" (Justice League Unlimited), an episode of Justice League Unlimited
 The Epilogue, appeared on BBC radio and television for many years as a sermonette
 "Epilogue" (CSI: NY episode), a season six premiere of CSI: NY

Music 
 Epilog (album), a 1994 album by Änglagård
 Epilogue (To/Die/For album), a 2001 album by To/Die/For
 Epilogue (Epik High album), a 2010 compilation album by Epik High
 Epilogue (Blake Babies EP), 2002
 "Epilogue", by Electric Light Orchestra from Time
 "Epilogue", by John Ireland
 "Epilogue, by Lovebites from Clockwork Immortality
 "Epilogue", by Twilight Force from Heroes of Mighty Magic

Other 
 Epilogue, a 2008-2009 four-issue comic book limited series published by IDW Publishing